The 2013 Indonesia Super League was the fifth season of the Indonesia Super League (ISL), a fully professional football competition as the top tier of the football league pyramid in Indonesia. The season began on 5 January 2013. Sriwijaya were the defending champions, having won their second league title.

This season was also the first season of ISL organized with authorization from the Joint Committee of PSSI until the establishment of a new league.

After the signing of the MoU between Djohar Arifin Husin (PSSI) and La Nyalla Matalitti (KPSI-PSSI) that was initiated by FIFA and the AFC through the Asian Football Confederation's Task Force, now Indonesia Super League was under the control of the Joint Committee to remain manageable by PT Liga Indonesia until the establishment of a new professional competition by the committee.

In the original plan the league season would have begun in November. But to honor the results of the joint committee meeting, the league schedule was postponed. At a meeting with club participants decided that the league would precisely start at 5 January 2013 and end on 18 September of the same year.

Teams
PSMS Medan, Deltras and PSAP Sigli were relegated during the end of the Previous season . They were replaced by the best three teams from the 2011–12 Liga Indonesia Premier Division (LI), PS Barito Putera, Persita Tangerang and Persepam Pamekasan.

Fourth-placed Premier Division sides PSIM Yogyakarta failed to be promoted to the Indonesia Super League after being defeated by the 15th-placed finishers of 2011–12 Indonesia Super League, Gresik United by score 3–1.

Indonesian Premier League Champion (IPL) season 2011/2012, Semen Padang finally officially returned to the Indonesia Super League (ISL). The Return of Semen Padang to ISL was known as PT Liga Indonesia issued numbered 01010/Liga/X/2012, regarding the delivery status of Semen Padang.

Finalize participant Indonesia Super League (ISL) season 2013 was completed on 30 October 2012. After that PT Liga Indonesia built on the planning competition.

Stadium and locations

Stadiums (2013 season)
Primary venues used in the Indonesia Super League:

Personnel and kits

Note: Flags indicate national team as has been defined under FIFA eligibility rules. Players and Managers may hold more than one non-FIFA nationality.

1Gustavo Chena is Gresik United captain, before he leaves the club after his contract terminated.
2Aldo Barreto was Gresik captain until 14 June, when he suffered an injury due to a broken hand when playing against Arema and adjudged not to play again until the Super League finish. Ambrizal was handed the captaincy in Aldo's absence. 
3Eka Ramdani was Pelita captain until April, when he was injured. Mijo Dadić was handed the captaincy in Eka's absence. 
4Ambrizal is PSPS captain, before he resigned from the club and joined Gresik United.

Coach changes

Pre-season

In season

Foreign players

Note:
1Those players who were born and started their professional career abroad but have since gained Indonesia Residency;
2Foreign residents or foreign residents of Indonesian descent who have chosen to represent Indonesian national team;
3Injury Replacement Players;
4Pass away Players (R.I.P)

League table

Persijap Jepara and Semen Padang FC returned to Indonesia Super League this season, but in last November Persijap and Semen Padang withdrew and joined Premier League

Results

The fixtures for the Super League were released on 14 December 2012. The season kicked off on 5 January 2013 and is scheduled to conclude on 7 September 2013.

Promotion/relegation play-off

Play on 22 September 2013 in Manahan Stadium, Surakarta ( Central Java)

Season statistics

Top scorers

Own goals

Hat-tricks

 4 Player scored 4 goals
 5 Player scored 5 goals

Scoring
First goal of the season: Dane Milovanović for Pelita Bandung Raya against Barito Putera (5 January 2013)
Fastest goal of the season: 35 seconds – Rizky Ripora for Barito Putera against Mitra Kukar (21 May 2013)
Widest winning margin: 8 goals
Persela Lamongan 9–1 PSPS Pekanbaru (12 June 2013)
Highest scoring game: 10 goals
Persela Lamongan 9–1 PSPS Pekanbaru (12 June 2013)
Mitra Kukar 8–2 PSPS Pekanbaru (15 September 2013)
Most goals scored in a match by a single team: 9 goals
Persela Lamongan 9–1 PSPS Pekanbaru (12 June 2013)
Most goals scored in a match by a losing team: 3 goals
Gresik United 3–4 Sriwijaya (1 March 2013)
Persib Bandung 4–3 Pelita Bandung Raya (11 June 2013)
Widest home winning margin: 8 goals
Persela Lamongan 9–1 PSPS Pekanbaru (12 June 2013)
Widest away winning margin: 6 goals
PSPS Pekanbaru 0–6 Persija Jakarta (24 August 2013)
Most goals scored by a home team: 9 goals
Persela Lamongan 9–1 PSPS Pekanbaru (12 June 2013)
Most goals scored by an away team: 6 goals
PSPS Pekanbaru 0–6 Persija Jakarta (24 August 2013)

Clean sheets
Most clean sheets: 19
Persipura Jayapura
Fewest clean sheets: 3
Pelita Bandung Raya

Achievement

Monthly awards
The selection is done by a team of Technical Study Group (TSG) which was formed by PT Liga Indonesia. TSG is a part of the High Performance Group (HPG), whose task is to analyze the technical, the whole game Indonesia Super League and also determine individual worthy of the award. The team consists of Joppie Lepel, Yeyen Tumena, Demis Djamaoeddin, and Tommy Welly.

Season award
The selection is done by a team of Technical Study Group (TSG).

Attendances

Top 10 Attendances

References

 
Top level Indonesian football league seasons
Indonesia Super League seasons
Indonesia
Indonesia
1